Society and Defence is a Swedish non-governmental organisation which acts as a forum for debate over defence and national security issues in Sweden. It has other organisations rather than individuals as its members. The membership, of about 50, includes youth leagues of political parties, trade unions, business associations, royal academies, voluntary defence organisations and others.

See also 
Swedish Armed Forces
Swedish Emergency Management Agency
Swedish National Board of Psychological Defence
Government of Sweden
Royal Swedish Academy of War Sciences
Royal Swedish Society of Naval Sciences
Non-governmental organisations in Sweden
List of political parties in Sweden
Scandinavian defence union

External links 
Society and Defense

Think tanks based in Sweden
Military-related organizations
Foreign policy and strategy think tanks
Defense policy
Security sector governance and reform
Debating societies
Politics of Sweden